Pythium emineosum is a plant pathogen, first isolated in Canada.

References

Further reading
Long, Yan-Yan, et al. "Two new species, Pythium agreste and P. wuhanense, based on morphological characteristics and DNA sequence data." Mycological progress 13.1 (2014): 145–155.

External links
 MycoBank

Water mould plant pathogens and diseases
emineosum